Fabio Firmani (born 26 May 1978) is an Italian retired footballer who played as a midfielder.

He amassed Serie A totals of 83 games and four goals over the course of ten seasons, representing in the competition Vicenza, Chievo, Bologna and Lazio.

Club career
Born in Rome, Firmani began his career with local A.S. Lodigiani in 1995, moving the following season to Vicenza Calcio. He remained at the latter club for seven years, making his Serie A debut on 26 January 1997 in a 3–2 home win against ACF Fiorentina and going on to collect nearly 100 official appearances. He also scored in the quarter-finals of the 1997–98 UEFA Cup Winners' Cup against Roda JC, in a 9–1 aggregate routing.

During his time in Veneto, Firmani headed south for a year, spending the 1998–99 campaign on loan at Reggina Calcio and splitting 2001–02 between A.C. Chievo Verona (co-ownership with Vicenza) and Bologna F.C. 1909. After competing in Serie B in 2002–03 with S.S.C. Venezia, he was finally released and joined Calcio Catania, helping them to two mid-table positions in the competition.

The following year, Firmani signed with hometown's S.S. Lazio, replacing Juventus-bound Giuliano Giannichedda. He made a good start to his career in the capital, but suffered a serious injury in November 2005, causing him to miss to rest of the campaign.

On 25 November 2007, Firmani scored his first goal for the Biancocelesti against Parma F.C. at the Stadio Olimpico, in a 1–0 victory. The goal, which was scored in the 90th minute, came only a week after the death of his good friend Gabriele Sandri, who was shot by a policeman, and the player's celebration with fans in Curva Nord earned him their recognition; due to injuries, he only managed seven appearances for the season but still netted three times, the other two being successful strikes against U.S. Città di Palermo and S.S.C. Napoli.

Firmani's streak with injuries continued throughout the following campaign and, due to several physical problems, he did not feature whatsoever for his team. He did however, receive a red card during the 1–4 home loss to Cagliari Calcio, when he reacted to an incident involving opponent Daniele Conti and Goran Pandev. He received adulation and support from the Lazio fans following the incident, due to the insipid nature of the team's performance – a popular message was then adopted by the side's faithful, Noi vogliamo undici Firmani (We want eleven Firmanis).

Shortly after the incident, Firmani was requested by Lazio to accept a loan move that would help him regain match fitness. The club suggested some Saudi teams, but the player instead requested he joined Al-Wasl F.C. in the United Arab Emirates; subsequently, the Italians accepted the latter offer.

Firmani returned to Lazio in July 2009, starting preseason training in the northern town of Auronzo di Cadore and trying to earn himself a place in new coach Davide Ballardini's team. In February 2011, after being released upon his request, the 33-year-old joined Chinese Super League side Shaanxi Renhe FC.

International career
Firmani was never called up to the Italy national team, but collected ten caps for the under-21 side, scoring once.

He was a member of the side which won the 2000 UEFA European Under-21 Championship, and also played Olympic football in the same year, in Sydney.

References

External links

2007–08 profile at La Gazzetta dello Sport  
 Profile at Rai 

1978 births
Living people
Footballers from Rome
Italian footballers
Association football midfielders
Serie A players
Serie B players
Serie C players
A.S. Lodigiani players
L.R. Vicenza players
Reggina 1914 players
A.C. ChievoVerona players
Bologna F.C. 1909 players
Venezia F.C. players
Catania S.S.D. players
S.S. Lazio players
UAE Pro League players
Al-Wasl F.C. players
Chinese Super League players
Beijing Renhe F.C. players
Italy under-21 international footballers
Italy youth international footballers
Olympic footballers of Italy
Footballers at the 2000 Summer Olympics
Italian expatriate footballers
Expatriate footballers in the United Arab Emirates
Italian expatriate sportspeople in the United Arab Emirates
Expatriate footballers in China
Italian expatriate sportspeople in China